Cognitive work analysis (CWA) is a framework that was developed to model complex sociotechnical work systems. The framework models different types of constraints, building a model of how work could proceed within a given work system. The focus on constraints separates the technique from other approaches to analysis that aim to describe how work is actually conducted, or prescribe how it should be conducted.

The CWA approach can be used to describe the constraints imposed by the purpose of a system, its functional properties, the nature of the activities that are conducted, the roles of the different actors, and their cognitive skills and strategies. Rather than offer a prescribed methodology, the CWA framework instead acts as a toolkit that can be used either individually or in combination with one another, depending upon the analysis needs. These tools are divided between phases. The exact names and scopes of these phases differ slightly dependent on the scope of the analysis; however, the overall scope remains largely the same. As defined by Vicente (1999), the CWA framework comprises five different phases; work domain analysis, control task (or activity) analysis, strategies analysis, social organisation and co-operation analysis, and worker competencies analysis.

The different tools within the CWA framework have been used for a plethora of different purposes, including system modelling, system design, process design, training needs analysis, training design and evaluation, interface design and evaluation, information requirements specification, tender evaluation, team design, and error management training design. Despite its origin within the nuclear power domain, the CWA applications referred to above have taken place in a wide range of different domains, including naval, military, aviation, driving, and health care domains.

It is especially difficult to prescribe a strict procedure for the CWA framework. In its true form, the framework is used to provide a description of the constraints within a domain. This description can then be used to address specific research and design aims.

References

See also 
 AcciMap analysis
 Behavioral systems analysis

Business process modelling
Ergonomics